Bartczak is a Polish surname, it may refer to:
 Andrzej Marian Bartczak (born 1945), Polish graphic artist, painter, illustrator and educator
 Grzegorz Bartczak (born 1985), Polish footballer
 Jolanta Bartczak (born 1964), retired Polish long jumper
 Mateusz Bartczak (born 1979), Polish footballer
 Tadeusz Bartczak, Polish chemist

Polish-language surnames